The 1992–93 Greek Football Cup was the 51st edition of the Greek Football Cup.

Tournament details

Totally 72 teams participated, 18 from Alpha Ethniki, 18 from Beta, and 36 from Gamma. It was held in 6 rounds, included final.

Without particular surprises, minus the elimination of Aris in the Group stage by Ethnikos Piraeus and Paniliakos, teams of lower divisions, the three big teams of Attica qualified easily or with difficulty to semi-finals. In that round, Olympiacos eliminated AEK Athens, the season's champions, after two very interesting matches, with qualification to be judged in extra time. Panathinaikos had easier work against Apollon Athens.

In the Final, that was held in Olympic Stadium, Panathinaikos managed to win their eternal opponent by 1–0, opening the street for a line of three possessed wins of the Cup. Vasilis Dimitriadis was elected as first scorer, scoring 10 goals.

Calendar

Group stage

The phase was played in a single round-robin format. Each win would gain 2 points, each draw 1 and each loss would not gain any point.

Group 1

Group 2

Group 3

Group 4

Group 5

Group 6

Group 7

Group 8

Group 9

Group 10

Group 11

Group 12

Group 13

Group 14

Group 15

Group 16

Knockout phase
Each tie in the knockout phase, apart from the final, was played over two legs, with each team playing one leg at home. The team that scored more goals on aggregate over the two legs advanced to the next round. If the aggregate score was level, the away goals rule was applied, i.e. the team that scored more goals away from home over the two legs advanced. If away goals were also equal, then extra time was played. The away goals rule was again applied after extra time, i.e. if there were goals scored during extra time and the aggregate score was still level, the visiting team advanced by virtue of more away goals scored. If no goals were scored during extra time, the winners were decided by a penalty shoot-out. In the final, which were played as a single match, if the score was level at the end of normal time, extra time was played, followed by a penalty shoot-out if the score was still level.The mechanism of the draws for each round is as follows:
There are no seedings, and teams from the same group can be drawn against each other.

Bracket

Round of 32

|}

Round of 16

|}

Quarter-finals

|}

Semi-finals

|}

Final

The 49th Greek Cup Final was played at the Olympic Stadium.

References

External links
Greek Cup 1992-93 at RSSSF

Greek Football Cup seasons
Greek Cup
Cup